Denis Nikolayevich Menchov (born 25 January 1978) is a former professional Russian road bicycle racer, who rode as a professional between 2000 and 2013. He was best known as a general classification rider, a climber and an accomplished time trialist. In 2005 he finished second in the Vuelta a España and in 2007 he finished as the champion. He also won the centenary Giro d'Italia in 2009 and finished second in the Tour de France in 2010 becoming the first Russian to do so. He was later disqualified from that Tour de France, as well as the 2009 and 2012 editions, owing to adverse biological passport findings.

Professional career

Banesto (2000–2004)
Born in Oryol, Menchov started his professional career in 2000 with the  team of José Miguel Echevarri. His first success came in 2001, when he won the Tour de l'Avenir, a stage race for young professionals. A year later he won a stage in the Dauphiné Liberé. In 2003, Menchov had his breakthrough when he finished 11th in the Tour de France, and won the young rider classification. 2004 was his last year at Banesto and his most successful. He won Tour of the Basque Country, a stage in Vuelta a Aragón, a stage in Paris–Nice and stage five in the 2004 Vuelta a España, from Zaragoza to Morella.

Rabobank (2005–2010)
Menchov's contract ran out in September 2004 and he moved to the Dutch Rabobank team for two years. He became team captain following Levi Leipheimer's departure to Gerolsteiner. Menchov was Rabobank's main contender for the 2005 Tour de France, but due to a cold, he finished 85th, 2h 35m behind Lance Armstrong. His 2005 Vuelta was more successful. He won the opening time trial to Granada and the stage nine time trial to Lloret de Mar, and wore the leader's jersey. On the fifteen stage, he lost sight of Roberto Heras on a climb and ended the race second behind Heras. Heras was later disqualified for doping, and Menchov received the official win of the 2005 Vuelta, but the title was given back to Heras in 2012. He also captured the event's Combined Classification.

In the 2006 Tour de France Menchov won the 11th stage – the second mountain stage –  from Tarbes to Aran Valley–Pla-de-Beret after a sprint with Leipheimer and Floyd Landis. The final week took its toll and he dropped from 3rd to 6th in the Alps. He later moved up to 5th overall after the disqualification of race winner Floyd Landis.

Menchov abandoned the 2007 Tour de France on stage 17, the day after his teammate Michael Rasmussen was fired from Rabobank. Later that year, he won the Vuelta a España after leading during the second half of the race. In the Vuelta he also won a stage, the mountains classification and the combination classification.

In 2008 Menchov concentrated on Tour de France and did not defend his Vuelta title. He ended third in the Tour because Bernhard Kohl was disqualified for doping. Also Menchov finished fifth in Giro prior.

In 2009 Menchov won the Giro d'Italia, with wins in stages 5 and 12. Despite crashing in the final kilometer of the last-stage time-trial through Rome, Menchov held the pink jersey and extended his lead by 21 seconds, winning by 41 seconds over Italy's Danilo Di Luca. Menchov also won the points jersey that year.

In the 2010 Tour de France, Menchov came in second place after passing Samuel Sánchez in the final Time Trial. He was third originally, but moved to the second spot as a consequence of Contador's victory being revoked due to a doping affair, as was decided on 6 February 2012.

Geox-TMC (2011)
Later in 2010 Menchov transferred to Geox-TMC, as joint leader of the team with Carlos Sastre. Menchov was replaced as leader of Rabobank by Robert Gesink. With Geox, Menchov finished 8th in the 2011 Giro. The team were not invited to the Tour de France, a blow to Menchov, who had been considered a favourite. Menchov finished fifth overall at the Vuelta a España, having helped teammate Juan José Cobo to overall victory.

Katusha (2012–2013)
At the end of 2011, Menchov moved to Russian team  for the 2012 season. Menchov focused the 2012 season on the 2012 Tour de France, although he was devastated with crashes. Menchov also won the Russian national time trial crown. He started Tour very well with eighth place in prologue, but due to health problems finished only 15th place overall at the end. He rode in the 2012 Summer Olympics representing the Russian National Team both in Olympic road race and individual time trial After, the Olympic Games, Menchov rode the Vuelta a España where he won the penultimate stage in Bola del Mundo after outsprinting Richie Porte. After suffering a knee injury before the Giro d'Italia, Menchov announced his retirement from the sport of cycling in 2013.

Return to the sport: Gazprom–RusVelo (2019) 
Menchov will return to cycling in 2019, in the role of directeur sportif for UCI Pro-Continental team Gazprom–RusVelo.

Doping
On 10 July 2014, a UCI press release detailing various athlete sanctions specified that Menchov had been banned (for a period of two years) until 9 April 2015 due to adverse biological passport findings. Due to this, he has been disqualified from the 2009, 2010 and 2012 Tours de France.

On 22 January 2015, USADA released its reasoned decision on the case of Dr. Geert Leinders in which it stated that Menchov received blood transfusions during the 2005 Tour de France.

Career achievements

Major results

1997
 1st Volta a Lleida
2001
 1st  Overall Tour de l'Avenir
 7th Overall Critérium du Dauphiné Libéré
2002
 6th Overall Critérium du Dauphiné Libéré
1st Stage 2
2003
 1st  Young rider classification, Tour de France
 1st Clásica a los Puertos de Guadarrama
2004
 1st  Overall Tour of the Basque Country
1st Stage 4
 1st Stage 5 Vuelta a España
 1st Stage 6 Paris–Nice
 1st Stage 1 Vuelta a Aragón
2005
 2nd Overall Vuelta a España
1st  Combination classification
1st Stages 1 & 9
 3rd Overall Tour de Romandie
2006
 5th Overall Tour de France
1st Stage 11
 6th Overall Critérium du Dauphiné Libéré
1st Stage 4
 9th Overall Volta a Catalunya
2007
 1st  Overall Vuelta a España
1st  Mountains classification
1st  Combination classification
1st Stage 10
 3rd Overall Volta a Catalunya
1st  Points classification
1st Stage 5
 4th Overall Critérium du Dauphiné Libéré
2008
 3rd Overall Tour de France
 4th Overall Tour de Romandie
 5th Overall Giro d'Italia
 5th Overall Vuelta a Castilla y León
 6th Clásica de San Sebastián
2009
 1st  Overall Giro d'Italia
1st  Points classification 
1st Stages 5, 10 & 12
 1st  Overall Vuelta a Murcia
2010
 2nd Overall Tour de Romandie
 2nd Overall Vuelta a Murcia
 2nd Overall Tour de France
2011
 2nd Overall Vuelta a Murcia
1st Stage 2
 5th Overall Vuelta a España
 5th Overall Tour of Austria
 7th Overall Giro d'Italia
2012
 1st  Time trial, National Road Championships
 1st Stage 20 Vuelta a España
 4th Overall Vuelta a Andalucía
2013
 4th Overall Volta ao Algarve
 8th Gran Premio Città di Camaiore

General classification results timeline

DSQ = Disqualified

References

External links

Cyclists at the 2004 Summer Olympics
Cyclists at the 2008 Summer Olympics
Cyclists at the 2012 Summer Olympics
Doping cases in cycling
Russian Giro d'Italia stage winners
Giro d'Italia winners
Olympic cyclists of Russia
Russian male cyclists
Russian sportspeople in doping cases
Russian Tour de France stage winners
Russian Vuelta a España stage winners
Vuelta a España winners
1978 births
Living people
Sportspeople from Oryol